Superior Soldiers, known in Japan as , is a 1993 fighting arcade game developed and published by Irem. It was created during the fighting game trend of the 1990s that began with Capcom's Street Fighter II. Several graphic designers of this and several other Irem titles later moved to Nazca, and designed the graphics of the Metal Slug franchises for SNK.

Characters

There are eight fighters in the game.
 (known outside Japan as Starsaber; however the back of the North American arcade flyer spells his name as Star Sabor.) - The protagonist character of the game.
 - A female fighter dressed as a scantily-clad dancer.
 - A nuclear human remodeled with a built-in battery. 
 (known outside Japan as Cattydox) - A female strip dancer. 
 (known outside Japan as Busido) - An armoured male samurai.  
 (known outside Japan as Reptilian) - The dinosaur with a personality that isn't violent. 
 (known outside Japan as Satinsect) - A mutant that has been turned into a human-consuming demon. 
 (known in North America as Skull Reaper) - The antagonist of the game. Upon defeat, an entity emerges from its body identifying itself as Bydo, a reference to the antagonist of Irem's R-Type series.

Regional differences
Besides the names of several characters, the North American version, Superior Soldiers lacks other things that are seen in the Japanese version, Perfect Soldiers. The Japanese version has an announcer shouting the name of the game at the title screen, as well as names of "who VS. who" at the VS. screens in Engrish. However, the well-known "Winners Don't Use Drugs" screen and new color graphics were added to the North American version.

References

External linksPerfect Soldiers at The Large Cult Fighting Game March Superior Soldiers'' at arcade-history

1993 video games
Arcade video games
Arcade-only video games
Fighting games
Irem games
Multiplayer and single-player video games
Video games developed in Japan
Video games set in 1999